There have not been bishops in the Church of Scotland since the Restoration Episcopacy of the 17th century, although there have occasionally been attempts to reintroduce episcopalianism.

Like most Reformed Churches, the Church of Scotland has a presbyterian structure which invests in a hierarchy of courts, that authority which other denominations give to bishops. Nevertheless, the Church of Scotland does have the concept of a bishop, and there has been debate about widening this concept.

Historical background

The word bishop is derived from Greek episcopos, meaning "overseer".  The word is used in the New Testament, but it is not certain what exactly the function of this office entailed in the Early Church.  By the third century, however, both the Eastern (Orthodox) and Western (Catholic) Church had a system of bishops as spiritual rulers.

After the Reformation, the Lutheran and Anglican traditions retained the episcopal system.  The churches of the radical reformation, however, mostly rejected bishops, believing this concentration of power in the hands of a few individuals to be one of the causes of what they perceived as the corruption of the pre-Reformation Church. During the Scottish Reformation, the reformer John Knox initially wanted bishops in the Church of Scotland, but the transparency of the Presbyterian system, where all decisions are made in public meetings, was ultimately preferred.

During parts of the 17th century there were conflicts between the Presbyterian and Episcopalian tendencies in the Kirk (see Bishops' Wars), with Episcopalianism (patronised by the monarch) sometimes in the ascendancy. Presbyterianians finally gained the upper hand, leading to the establishment of a separate Episcopal Church of Scotland in 1690.

For a list of the 17th-century Church of Scotland bishops, see Bishop of Edinburgh, Archbishop of Glasgow and Bishop of Aberdeen.

Historical Recognition of Episcopal Ordination

On 10 February 1645 the General Assembly of the Kirk of Scotland approved a document produced by the Westminster Divines outlining the nature of Presbyterian governance. This document, The Form of Presbyterial Church Government did not include bishops within its 
recognition of church officers, listing the valid offices thusly:

However, this lack of recognition for an office of episcopate distinct from that of a presbyter did not entail a rejection of the validity of ordinations by the Anglican Bishops of the Church of England. This allowed for former ministers of the English church to be received into service of the Church of Scotland, following suitable examination, without reordination.

Use of the term "bishop" in the Church of Scotland today
Although the Church of Scotland had no bishops after 1690, the term "bishop" is Biblical and it is not surprising that a Presbyterian Church, with its focus on the Bible, should retain the word in its basic sense of "one who has oversight".  Specifically, a minister who is placed in charge of a person training for the ministry is referred to as the student's bishop.  This term is used in the context of theology students doing "student attachments" (work-experience placements) in parishes and later of graduates who must complete a probationary year in a parish prior to ordination. Most lay people in the Church of Scotland, however, would be unaware of this usage.

Proposals to reintroduce episcopacy
In the latter part of the 20th century, there were a number of moves to reopen the debate on episcopacy.  Presbyteries may be more transparent than bishops in their wielding of power, but they have often proved rather less good at the pastoral care of parish ministers, a problem with which the Church has frequently wrestled.  One proposed solution, under the catchphrase "incorporating episcopacy into our system", was for presbyteries to appoint full-time or part-time bishops to minister to the ministers on the presbyteries' behalf.  These bishops would not have the power of bishops in other traditions, but would have analogous pastoral functions.  Precedents for such a "mixed system" were to be found in the Uniting Church in Australia and elsewhere.

The most serious presentation of such proposals came in the 1980s when a union between the Church of Scotland and the Scottish Episcopal Church was attempted.  A precondition from the Episcopalian side was that the united church should have a form of episcopacy recognisable to their tradition.  Negotiations for the proposed union were almost completed, and were ratified by the General Assembly, but were voted down by the Church of Scotland's presbyteries when referred to them under the Barrier Act.

In the 1990s, the Scottish Churches Initiative for Union (SCIFU) aimed to unite the Church of Scotland, Scottish Episcopal Church, the Methodist Church (in Scotland) and the United Reformed Church (in Scotland) by 2010. An element of the proposed structure was again a form of episcopal oversight, whilst retaining elders from the Presbyterian system. After considerable debate, the SCIFU proposals were rejected by the General Assembly of the Church of Scotland in May 2003.

The proposed structure of the post-union Scottish church was described by Albert H. Lee as:

Modern Declarations
In the 21st Century, the Church of Scotland has made two declarations between itself and the Church of England and the Scottish Episcopal Church respectively in which the issue of oversight, episkope was recognised but not resolved into a common polity.

St Columba Declaration
The St Columba Declaration was written in 2015, by the work of the Church of England – Church of Scotland Joint Study Group, in the aftermath of the "No" vote in the 2014 Scottish independence referendum and building upon the 2010 report Our Fellowship in the Gosepel.

St Andrew Declaration
The St Andrew Declaration emerged from the work of Our Common Calling Working Group of the Church of Scotland and the Scottish Episcopal Church and was approved by the General Assembly of the Church of Scotland in May 2021 and by the General Synod of the Scottish Episcopal Church in June 2021. Signed on 30 November 2021, this declaration is very similar in wording to the St Columba Declaration, from which the Scottish Episcopal Church was excluded, causing grave offence.

Comparison of the Declarations

References

See also

 Five Articles of Perth
 The Killing Time
 Tulchan

17th century in Scotland
1690 in Christianity
Church of Scotland
Church of Scotland
Wars of the Three Kingdoms
17th-century Calvinism